The Yashadamini Puraskar is awarded by the Government of Goa state in (India). It is an annual award conferred by the Directorate of Women & Child Development of the Government of Goa. The award was established in 2001.

Description
The award aims to encourage women in different fields. It is awarded to the women who have made a mark in various fields, such as sports, education, art and culture, social work, cooperative movement, women empowerment, teaching and other professions, etc.

The prize consists of a cash award of Rupees Ten Thousand and a silver salver.

List of Awardees
Following are some of the awardees of the Yashadamini Puraskar-

References

External links
 Announcement for award in 2015
 Department of Women and Child Development

Government of Goa
Awards established in 2001
Goan society
Civil awards and decorations of Goa